Waterton Park, commonly referred to as Waterton, is a hamlet in southwestern Alberta, Canada within Improvement District No. 4 Waterton (Waterton Lakes National Park).

This hamlet is north of Glacier National Park in Montana.

The hamlet is located in Census Division No. 3 and in the federal riding of Lethbridge.

Demographics 

Climate 
Waterton Park has a humid continental climate (Köppen Dfb), just above the subarctic climate (Dfc). Summers are mild with cool nights, while winters are chilly with highs around freezing. Precipitation is relatively consistent year round, but peaks during the months of May and June.

See also 

List of communities in Alberta
List of designated places in Alberta
List of hamlets in Alberta

References 

Hamlets in Alberta
Designated places in Alberta
Waterton Lakes National Park